From What Is Before is a 2014 Filipino drama film directed by Lav Diaz. The film follows a remote town in the Philippines during the 1970s under the Marcos dictatorship. The film had its world premiere in the Philippines on July 3, 2014, and competed at the 2014 Locarno International Film Festival where it won the main prize, the Golden Leopard.

The film also had its North American premiere at the 2014 Toronto International Film Festival, under the Wavelengths section. In addition, the film had its Philippine screening held for free on September 21, 2014. The film had its U.S. premiere, as part of the World Cinema section, at the 2014 AFI Fest. The film won Best Picture at the Gawad Urian.

Plot 
The Philippines, 1972. Mysterious things are happening in a remote barrio. Wails are heard from the forest, cows are hacked to death, a man is found bleeding to death at the crossroad and houses are burned. Ferdinand E. Marcos announces Proclamation No. 1081 putting the entire country under Martial Law.

Everything became a mess when the Armed Forces of the Philippines decided to camp in the barrio. Or was it already messed up before?

Cast 
Perry Dizon as Sito
Roeder as Tony
Hazel Orencio as Itang
Karenina Haniel as Joselina
Reynan Abcede as Hakob
Mailes Kanapi as Heding

Reception
Rotten Tomatoes, a review aggregator gives the film an approval rating of 89% based on 9 reviews, with a weighted average of 7/10.

Awards and nominations

References

External links 

2014 films
Philippine drama films
Philippine avant-garde and experimental films
Golden Leopard winners
Films directed by Lav Diaz
Films set in 1972
Films set in the Philippines
Films shot in the Philippines